Gustav Fredrik Dolk (born 14 December 1961) is a Swedish actor. He is a noted voice actor and has delivered the Swedish voice of Buzz Lightyear in Toy Story, Splinter in Teenage Mutant Ninja Turtles (1987), Superman in Superman: The Animated Series and Tuxedo Mask in Sailor Moon. He has appeared on stage, in television and films since 1991. He cameoed in the 2010 Swedish science fiction horror film Sector 236 – Thor's Wrath. In 2011 he appeared in David Fincher's The Girl with the Dragon Tattoo. He will appear in the upcoming Swedish horror film Wither, a film based on Swedish folklore.

Filmography

References

External links

Swedish male film actors
1961 births
Living people
Swedish male voice actors
People from Solna Municipality
Swedish male television actors